Virgin Life Care is a fitness group in South Africa owned by Virgin Group.

It has a head office in Claremont, Cape Town, and is part of the Virgin Active Group in South Africa.

References

External links 
 

Companies based in Cape Town
Medical and health organisations based in South Africa
L